Ndengo is a village in  the Ruvuma Region of southwestern Tanzania. It is located along the A19 road, north of Nyoni and south of Mbinga.

References

Populated places in Ruvuma Region